

Short history

The Dua't al-Mutlaqin

Al-Malika al-Sayyida (Hurratul-Malika) was instructed and prepared by Imām Mustansir and following Imāms for the second period of satr. It was going to be on her hands that Imām Taiyab abi al-Qasim would go into seclusion, and she would institute the office of Da'i al-Mutlaq. Syedna Zoeb bin Moosa was first to be instituted to this office, and the line of Taiyabi Dā'ĩs that began in 1132 has passed from one Dā'ī to another, continuing to the present time. One of the sects which follows these Fatimid Dā'īs is the Dawoodi Bohra dawat.

Until the 23rd Dā'ī, the center of the dawat was in Yemen. The 23rd Dā'ī, Syedna Mohammed Ezzuddin designated Syedna Yusuf Najmuddin ibn Sulaiman in Sidhpur, Gujarat, India, as his successor. Upon becoming the 24th Dā'ī, Yusuf Najmuddin ibn Sulaiman stayed in India for a few years before going to Yemen. He died and was buried there. Because of the intense persecutions against the dawat by the Zaydi rulers of Yemen, the 24th Dā'ī designated Syedna Jalal Shamshuddin in India as his successor, and the center of the dawat then moved permanently to India. The 25th Dā'ī also died in 1567 CE, and is buried in Ahmedabad, India, the first Dā'ī to have his mausoleum in India. Even though his time as Dā'ī was short – only a few months – he was Walī al-Hind under the 24th Dā'ī for 20 years.

After breaking with the Fatimid teaching hierarchy, the Tayyibiyah in the Yemen recognized the Sulayhid queen as the hujjah of the concealed imam Al-Tayyib; with her backing, they set up an independent teaching hierarchy headed by a da'i mutlaq ("unrestricted summoner") whose spiritual authority since her death in 1138 has been supreme. The second da'i mutlaq, Ibrahim Al-Hamidi (1151–1162), became the real founder of the tayyibi esoteric doctrine, which he elaborated especially in his Kitab kanz Al-walad (Book of the child's treasure). The position remained in his family until 1209, when it passed to Ali ibn Muhammad of the Banu Al-Walid Al-Anf family, which held it for more than three centuries with only two interruptions. The political power of the Yemenite da'is reached a peak during the long incumbency of Idris Imad Al-Din ibn Al-Hasan, the nineteenth da'i mutlaq (1428–1468). He is also the author of a seven-volume history of the Ismaili imams, Kitab uyun Al-akhbar (Book of choice stories) and of a two-volume history of the Yemenite da'is, Kitab nuzhat Al-akhbar (Book of story and entertainment), as well as works of esoteric doctrine and religious controversy. While the Yemenite da'is had been able to act relatively freely with the backing or protection of various rulers during the early centuries, they usually faced hostility from the Zaydi imams and in the sixteenth century suffered relentless persecution. In 1539 the twenty-third da'i mutlaq appointed an Indian, Yusuf ibn Sulayman, as his successor, evidently in recognition of the growing importance of the Indian tayyibi community. Yusuf came to reside in the Yemen, but after his death in 1566 his successor, also Indian, transferred the headquarters to Gujarat in India.

The insignificant Tayyibi communities in Egypt and Syria, known as Amiriyya, are only rarely mentioned in the sources. Toward the end of the 6th/12th century, there is a vague reference to the presence of Amiriyya in Egypt. In Syria a community of Amiriyya is still mentioned about the year 723/1324 in the Baqi'a and Zabud mountains near Safad. These isolated communities probably did not survive much longer. Only in Yemen and India could the Tayyibi da'wa, under the undisputed leadership of the da'i al mutlaq, establish itself permanently. After Ibrahim al-Hamidi the position of da'i mutlaq remained among his descendants until 605/1209, when it passed to 'Ali b. Muhammad of the Banu 'l-Walid al-Anf family, which was named after his ancestor Ibrahim al-Anf, who was a prominent supporter of the Salayhids and a descendant of the Umayyad al-Walid b. 'Utba b. Abi Sufyan. It remained in this family, with only two interruptions in the 7th/13th century, until 946/1539. The traditional stronghold of the Isma'ili da'wa in the Yemen was in the Haraz [q.v.] mountains, though there were scattered communities in other parts of the country. The da'is generally enjoyed the support, or at least protection, of the Hamdanids [q.v.], who permitted them to reside in San'a' and later, in the 8th/14th century, in the fortress of Dhu Marmar. Their relations with the Ayyubids and the Rasulids were fair, but the Zaydi imams were mostly hostile. The Zaydi pretender al-Mansur 'Ali b. Salah al-Din expelled them from Dhu Marmar in 829/1426 after a prolonged siege, and they established their residence in the Haraz mountains. The Zaydi Imam al-Mutahhar b. Sharaf al-Din in the 10th/16th century relentlessly persecuted the Banu 'l-Anf and seems to have practically extirpated the family. The relations with the da'wa in India remained close. There the Tayyibi community grew mostly undisturbed, though in the first half of the 9th/15th century persecution under the Sultanate of Gudjarat resulted in mass conversions to Sunnism. In 946/1539 the position of da'imutlaq passed to an Indian, and after his death in 947/1567 the headquarters were transferred to Gudjarat in India.

After the death of Da'ud b. 'Adjabshah, the 26th da'imutlaq, in 999/1591, the succession was disputed. While in India Da'ud Burhan al-Din was established, Da'ud b. Adjabshah's representative in the Yemen, Sulayman b. al-Hasan al-Hindi, claimed to have been designated successor by the deceased da'imutlaq. The dispute was not resolved and led to the permanent schism between the Da'udi and Sulaymani factions which accepted separate lines of da'is. Among the Sulaymanis, whose cause had only few adherents in India, the position of da'imutlaq in 1050/1640 passed to the Yemenite Ibrahim b. Muhammad b. Fahd of the Makrami [q.v.] family, in which it has remained since with few interruptions. The Makrami da'is established themselves in Nadjran [q.v.], where they were supported by the Banu Yam [q.v.]. Before 1131/1719 they conquered the Haraz region in the Yemen and held it against all attempts of the Zaydi imams to expel them. The Da'i al-Hasan b. Hibat Allah (d. 1189/1775) conquered Hadramawt and unsuccessfully fought the rising Su'udi dynasty in Central Arabia. From Haraz the Makramis were expelled in 1289/1872 by the Ottoman general Ahmad Mu¦htar Pasha, who took their fortress 'Attara and treacherously killed the Da'i al-Hasan b. Isma'il Al Shibam al-Makrami. The present da'imutlaq of the Sulaymanis is Jamal al-Din 'Ali b. al-Husayn al-Makrami, who succeeded his father in 1939 (see A. A. A. Fyzee, Three Sulaymani Da'is: 1936–1939, in JBBRAS, xvi (1940), 101–4). Besides the Banu Yam in Nadjran, the people of the Jabal Maghariba in Haraz are Sulayma-qnis. In India the Sulaymani da'is are represented by mansubs residing in Baroda. Sulaymanis live mainly in Bombay, Boroda, and Haydarabad, Dekkan.

The Da'udi da'is after the split continued to reside in India, where the great majority of their followers live. The da'wa generally was able to develop freely, though there was another wave of persecution under Awrangzib (1044/1635-1118/1707). Since 1200/1785 the headquarters of the da'is have been in Surat. The present da'imutlaq is Muhammad Burhan al-Din, who succeeded his father Tahir Sayf al-Din in 1966. Da'udi Isma'ilis live chiefly in Gudjarat, Bombay, and Central India. In Yemen there are Da'udis in the Haraz region. (For minor secessions from the Da'udis [see bohoras]).
 
The Tayyibiyah preserved a large portion of the Fatimid religious literature and generally maintained the traditions of Fatimid doctrine more closely than the Nizariyah. Thus the Tayyibi da'is always insisted on the equal importance of the zahir and batin aspects of religion, strict compliance with the religious law and esoteric teaching. Qadi Al-Numan's Da' a'im Al-Islam has remained the authoritative codex of Tayyibi law and ritual to the present. In the esoteric doctrine, however, there were some innovations which gave the Tayyibi gnosis its distinctive character. The Rasa'il Ikhwan Al-Safa'were accepted as the work of one of the pre-Fatimid hidden imams and were frequently quoted and interpreted.

The Tayyibiyah in India are commonly known as the Bohoras. There are, however, also Sunni and some Hindu Bohoras; they are mostly engaged in agriculture, while the Ismaili Bohoras are generally merchants. The origins of the Tayyibi community in Gujarat go back to the time before the Tayyibi schism. According to the traditional account an Arab da'i sent from the Yemen arrived in the region of Cambay with two Indian assistants in 1068. The Ismaili community founded by him, though led by local walis, always maintained close commercial as well as religious ties with the Yemen and was controlled by the Yemenite teaching hierarchy. It naturally followed the Yemenite community at the time of the schism. From Cambay the community spread to other cities, in particular Patan, Sidhpur, and Ahmadabad. In the first half of the fifteenth century the Ismailiyyah were repeatedly exposed to persecution by the Sunni sultans of Gujarat, and after a contested succession to the leadership of the Bohora community, a large section, known as the Jafariyah, seceded and converted to Sunnism.

After its transfer from the Yemen in 1566, the residence of the da'i mutlaq remained in India. The succession to the twenty-sixth da'i mutlaq, Daud ibn Ajabshah (d. 1591), was disputed. In India Daud Burhan Al-Din ibn Qut bshah was recognized by the great majority as the twenty-seventh da'i mutlaq. However, Daud ibn Ajabshah's deputy in the Yemen, Sulayman ibn Hasan, a grandson of the first Indian da'i mutlaq Yusuf ibn Sulayman, also claimed to have been the designated successor and after a few years he came to India to press his case. Although he found little support, the dispute was not resolved and resulted in the permanent split of the Daudi and Sulaymani factions recognizing separate lines of da'is.

The leadership of the Sulaymaniyah, whose Indian community was small, reverted to the Yemen with the succession of the thirtieth da'i mutlaq, Ibrahim ibn Muhammad ibn Fahd Al-Makrami, in 1677. Since then the position of da'i mutlaq has remained in various branches of the Makrami family except for the time of the forty-sixth da'i, an Indian. The Makrami da'is usually resided in Badr in Najran. With the backing of the tribe of the Banu Yam they ruled Najran independently and at times extended their sway over other parts of the Yemen and Arabia until the incorporation of Najran into Saudi Arabia in 1934. The peak of their power was in the time of the thirty-third da'i mutlaq, Ismail ibn Hibat Allah (1747–1770), who defeated the Wahhabiyah in Najd and invaded hadramawt. He is also known as the author of an esoteric Qur'an commentary, virtually the only religious work of a Sulaymani author published so far. Since Najran came under Saudi rule, the religious activity of the da'is and their followers has been severely restricted. In the Yemen the Sulaymaniyah are found chiefly in the region of Manakha and the haraz mountains. In India they live mainly in Baroda, Ahmadabad, and Hyderabad and are guided by a representative (mansub) of the da'i mutlaq residing in Baroda.
 
The da'is of the Daudiyah, who constitute the great majority of the Tayyibiyah in India, have continued to reside there. All of them have been Indians except the thirtieth da'i mutlaq, Ali Shams Al-Din (1621–1631), a descendant of the Yemenite da'i Idris EImad Al-Din. The community was generally allowed to develop freely although there was another wave of persecution under the emperor Awrangzib (1635–1707), who put the thirty-second da'i mutlaq, Qutb Al-Din ibn Daud, to death in 1646 and imprisoned his successor. The residence of the Daudi da'i mutlaq is now in Bombay, where the largest concentration of Bohoras is found. Outside Gujarat, Daudi Bohoras live in Maharashtra, Rajasthan, in many of the big cities of India, Pakistan, Sri Lanka, and Burma, and the East Africa. In the Yemen the Daudi community is concentrated in the Haraz mountains.

After the death of the twenty-eighth da'i mutlaq, Adam Safi Al-Din, in 1621, a small faction recognized his grandson Ali ibn Ibrahim as his successor and seceded from the majority recognizing Abd Al-Tayyib Zaki Al-Din. The minority became known as Alia Bohoras and have followed a separate line of da'is residing in Baroda. Holding that the era of the prophet Muhammad had come to an end, a group of Alias seceded in 1204/1789. Because of their abstention from eating meat they are called Nagoshias (not meat eaters). In 1761 a distinguished Daudi scholar, Hibat Allah ibn Ismail, claimed that he was in contact with the hidden imam, who had appointed him his hujjah and thus made his rank superior to that of da'i mutlaq. He and his followers, known as Hibtias, were excommunicated and persecuted by the Daudiyah. Only a few Hibtia families are left in Ujjain. Since the turn of the century a Bohora reform movement has been active. While recognizing the spiritual authority of the da'i mutlaq it has sought through court action to restrict his powers of excommunication and his absolute control over community endowments and alms. All of these groups are numerically insignificant.

During testimony of 51st Dai Syedna Taher Saifuddin, he clarified about knowledge classes of 'Zahir', 'Tawil' and, 'Haqiqat' present in community. First two are known to many but the third one namely 'Hakikat' content some religious truths known to very few. Some of which are known to only 2 or 3 persons in community, and there is also knowledge which is available with Dai only, and he gets it from his predecessor Dai.

The Walī-ul-Hind

Up to the 23rd Dā'ī, the center was at Yemen; for India, a "Walī al-Hind" (representative/caretaker for India) was designated by the Dā'ī to run the dawat in India. Moulai Abdullah was the first Walī al-Hind in the era of Imam Mustansir (427–487 AH). Moulai Abadullah (originally named Baalam Nath) and Moulai Nuruddin (originally named Roop Nath)  went to Cairo, Egypt, to learn, and went to India in 467 AH. Moulai Ahmed was also their companion.

Dā'ī Zoeb appointed Maulai Yaqoob (after the death of Maulai Abadullah), who was the second Walī al-Hind of the Fatimid dawat. Moulai Yaqoob was the first person of Indian origin to receive this honour under the Dā'ī. He was son of Moulai Bharmal, minister of Hindu Chaulukya king Jayasimha Siddharaja (Anhalwara,Patan) (487–527 AH/1094–1133 CE). With Minister Moulai Tarmal, they had honoured the Fatimid dawat along with their fellow citizens on the call of Moulai Abdullah. Moulai Fakhruddin, son of Moulai Tarmal, was sent to western Rajasthan, India, and Syedi Nuruddin went to the Deccan (death: Jumadi al-Ula 11 at Don Gaum, Aurangabad, Maharashtra, India).

One Dā'ī after another continued until the 23rd Dā'ī in Yemen. Persons were appointed to the position of Walī al-Hind one after another up to Walī al-Hind Moulai Jafer, Moulai Abdul Wahab, and Moulai Qasim Khan bin Hasan (the last one being the 11th Walī al-Hind, and who died in 950 AH/1543 CE in Ahmedabad). The Awliya al-Hind were champions of the Fatimid dawat in India, who were instrumental in maintaining & propagating it on instructions of the Dā'ī at Yemen, and it is because of them that the Fatimid dawat was able to survive the persecutions in Cairo and Yemen. A list of them is also given below along with the relevant Dā'īs. The dawat was transferred to India from Yemen when the 23rd Dā'ī Syedna Mohammed Ezzuddin designated as his successor (and, thus the 24th Dā'ī) Syedna Yusuf Najmuddin ibn Sulaiman in Sidhpur, Gujarat, India.

In the generation of Moulai Yaqoob, Moulai Ishaq, Moulai Ali, Syedi Hasan Feer continued one after another as Wali-ul-Hind. Syedi Hasan Feer was fifth Wali in the era of 16th Dai Abadullah (d.809 AH/1406 AD) of Yemen. Names of Wali al-hind are also given along with concerned Dai below.

Dua't al-Mutlaqeen
The following is a list of the Da'i al-Mutlaq.

1. Syedna Zoeb bin Moosa Al Waadei ذويب بن موسى الوادي
 Dai period: 530–546 AH/1138–1151 CE
 Place: Houth, Yemen
 Died: Moharram 10, 546 AH/5 May 1151 CE
 Mawazeen (Associate): Khattab bin Hasan,  Ebrahim bin Husain Al Hamidi

 1st Wali al-Hind: Moulai Abdullah at Khambhat, Gujarat. Died: Moharram 1st.
 Syedi Nuruddin covered Deccan (death: Jumadi al-Ula 11 at Don Gaum, Aurangabad, Maharashtra, India).
 Moulai Fakhruddin Shaheed covered Rajasthan (death Moharram 27 at Galiakot, Dungarpur, Rajasthan). 
 2nd Wali al-Hind: Moulai Yaqub bin Moulai Bharmal at Patan, Gujarat. Died: Rajab 14.

2. Syedna Ibrahim bin Husain Al Hamidi ابراهيم بن حسين الحميدي
 Dai period: 546–557 AH/ 1151–1162 AD
 Place of dai office: Bani Hamid, Yemen
 Death: 16 Shabaan, 557AH
 Mawazeen:  Ali bin Husain bin Ahmad bin Waleed,  Hatim bin  Ibrahim Al Hamidi
 Mukasir:  Mohammad bin Taher Al Haresi

3. Syedna Hatim ibn Ibrahim Al Hamidi حاتم بن ابراهيم الحميدي 
 Dai period: 557–596 AH/ 1162–1199 AD
 Place of dai office: Al-Hutaib, Yemen
 Death: 16 Moharram, 596
 Mawazeen:  Mohammad bin Taher, Ali bin Mohammadinil Waleed

4. Syedna Ali ibn Hatim Al Hamidi علي بن حاتم الحميدي 
 Dai Period: 596–605 AH/ 1199–1209 AD
 Place of dai office: Sanna, Yemen
 Death: 25 Zilqad, 605
 Mazoon: Ali bin Mohammadinil Waleed

5. Syedna Ali bin Muhammad Al Walid علي بن محمد الوليد 

 Dai period: 605–612 AH/ 1209–1216 AD
 Place of dai office: Ugmur (Haraaz), Yemen
 Death: 27 Shaban, 612
 Mazoon:  Ali bin Hanzala
 (3rd Wali-ul-Hind: Moulai Ishaq  bin Yaqub, Patan, Gujarat.)

6. Syedna Ali ibn Hanzala Al Waadei علي بن حنظلة الوادي
 Dai period: 612–626 AH/ 1216–1229 AD
 Place of dai office: Hamadan, Yemen
 Death: 22 Rabi-ul awwal, 626
 Mazoon:  Ahmad bin Mubaarak
 Mukasir:  Husain bin  Ali

7. Syedna Ahmad ibn Mubarak Al Walid احمد بن مبارك الوليد
 Dai period: 626–627 AH/ 1229–1230 AD
 Place of dai office: Hamadan, Yemen
 Death: 28 Jumadil akhir, 627
 Mazoon:  Husain bin  Ali
 Mukasir:  Al Qazil ajal Ahmad

8. Syedna Husain bin Ali Sahib Al Walid حسين بن علي صاحب الوليد 
 Dai period: 627–667 AH/ 1230–1269 AD
 Place of dai office: Sanna, Yemen
 Death: 28 Safar, 667
 Mawazeen:  Al Qazil ajal Ahmad,  Ali bin  Husain
 Mukasir: Syedi Mohammad bin Assad bin Mubaarak

 (4th Wali-ul-Hind: Moulai Ali bin Ishaq, Patan, Gujarat)

9. Syedna Ali bin Husain bin Ali bin Muhammad علي بن حسين بن علي بن محمد 
 Dai period: 667–682 AH/ 1269–1283 AD
 Place of dai office: Sanna, Yemen
 Death: 1 SAFAR, 682
 Mawazeen: Syedi Husain bin  Ali bin Hanzala,  Ali bin  Husain
 Mukasir: Sheikh Assad Hatim Sanjani

10. Syedna Ali bin Husain ععلي بن الحسين بن علي بن حنظلة 
 Dai period: 682–686 AH/ 1283–1287 AD
 Place of dai office: Sanna, Yemen
 Death: 13 Zilkad, 686
 Mazoon:  Ibrahim bin  Husain

11. Syedna Ibrahim bin Husain Al Walid ابراهيم بن حسين الوليد 
 Dai period: 686–728 AH/ 1287–1328 AD
 Place of dai office: Hisne Af’ida, Yemen
 Death: 10 Shawwal, 728AH/ 18 August 1378 AD 
 Mazoon:  Mohammad bin Syedi Hatim

12. Syedna Muhammad ibn Hatim Al Walid محمد بن حاتم الوليد 
 Dai period: 728–729 AH/ 1328–1329 AD
 Place of dai office: Hamadan, Yemen
 Death: 16 Juma-dil-Ula,729
 Mazoon:  Ali bin  Ibrahim

13. Syedna Ali Shams al-Din I bin Ibrahim علي شمس الدين بن ابراهيم 
 Dai period: 729–746 AH/ 1329–1345 AD
 Place of dai office: Hamadan, Yemen
 Death: 18 Rajab, 746
 Mazoon:  Abdul Muttalib Najmuddin

14. Syedna Abdul Muttalib Najmuddin bin Mohammed عبد المطلب نجم الدين 
 Dai period: 746–755 AH/ 1345–1354 AD
 Place of dai office: Zimarmar, Yemen
 Death: 24 Rajab,755/ 13 August 1354 AD
 Mazoon:  Abbas

15. Syedna Abbas ibn Muhammad عباس بن محمد 
 Dai period: 755–779 AH/ 1354–1377 AD
 Place of dai office: Hamadan, Yemen
 Death: 8 Shawwal,779
 Mazoon: Abdullah Fakhruddin bin Ali

16. Syedna Abdallah Fakhr al-Din bin Ali عبدالله فخر الدين بن علي 
 Dai period: 779–809 AH/ 1377–1406 AD
 Place of dai office: Zimarmar, Yemen
 Death: 9,Ramazan, 809/ 16 Feb, 1407AD
 Mawazeen:  Ali ash-Shaibani,  Husain, Hasan Badruddin
 Mukasir: Syedi Abdul Muttalib bin Abdullah

 (5th Wali-ul-Hind: Syedi Hasan Pir bin Ali, Denmal, Gujarat)

17. Syedna Al-Hasan Badr al-Din I bin Abdullah حسن بدر الدين بن عبد الله 
 Dai period: 809–821 AH/ 1406–1418 AD
 Place of dai office: Zimarmar, Yemen
 Death: 6 Shawwal, 821 AH / 5 Nov, 1418AD
 Mawazeen: Syedi Abdul Muttalib Najmuddin, Al Maula Mohammad bin Idris
 Mukasir: Syedi Ahmad bin  Abdullah

18. Syedna Ali Shams al-Din II bin Abdullah علي شمس الدين بن عبد الله 
 Dai period: 821–832 AH/ 1418–1429 AD
 Place of dai office: Al-Shariqa , Yemen
 Death: 3 Safar 832
 Mazoon:  Idris Imaduddin

 (6th Wali-ul-Hind: Moulai Adam bin Suleyman, Ahmedabad (Kankariya), Death; 13 Safar,836 AH)

19. Syedna Idris Imad al-Din bin Hasan ادريس عماد الدين بن حسن
 Dai period: 832–872 AH/ 1429–1467 AD
 Place of dai office: Shibaam, Yemen
 Death: 19 Zilqad 872
 Mazoon: Al Maula Masad bin Abdullah

 (7th Wali-ul-Hind: Moulai Hasan bin  Adam, Ahmedabad, Death; 28 Moharram,883 AH)

20. Syedna Al-Hasan Badr al-Din II bin Idris Imad al-Din حسن بدر الدين بن إدريس 
 Dai period: 872–918 AH/ 1467–1512 AD
 Place of dai office: Massar, Yemen
 Death: 15 Shaban 918
 Mazoon: Al Maula Abdullah Fakhruddin
 Mukasir:  Ali Shamsuddin bin  Husain

21. Syedna Al-Husayn Husam al-Din bin Idris Imad al-Din حسين حسام الدين بن إدريس
 Dai period: 918–933 AH/ 1512–1527 AD
 Place of dai office: Massar, Yemen
 Death: 10 Shawwal 933
 Mazoon:  Ali Shamsuddin

 (8th Wali-ul-Hind: Moulai Raj bin Hasan, Death; 1 Moharram, 925 AH)
 (9th Wali-ul-Hind: Moulai Jafer  bin Raj, Ahmedabad)
 (10th Wali-ul-Hind: Moulai Wahhab bin Firoz)

22. Syedna Ali Shams al-Din III bin Husain علي شمس الدين بن حسين
 Dai period: 933–933 AH/ 1527–1527 AD
 Place of dai office: Masaar, Yemen
 Death: 21 Zilqad 933AH
 Mazoon:  Muhammad Izz al-Din I

23. Syedna Muhammad Izz al-Din I bin Hasan محمد عز الدين بن حسن
 Dai period: 933–946 AH/ 1527–1539 AD
 Place of dai office: Zabeed, Yemen
 Death: 27 Safar 946
 Mazoon:  Yusuf Najmuddin

 (11th Wali-ul-Hind: Moulai Sheikh Qasim bin Hasan, Ahmedabad, Death; 27th Jumadil ula, 950 AH)

24. Syedna Yusuf Najmuddin I bin Sulaiman يوسف نجم الدين بن سليمان 
 Tomb: Taibah, Yemen
 Dai period: 946–974 AH/ 1539–1567 AD
 Place of dai office: Sidhpur, Gujarat, India
 Death: 16 zilhazza 974
 Mazoon:  Jalal Shamsuddin
 Mukasir: Maulai Miya Musaji

 (Dawat moved to India) to: (the 12th and last Wali-ul-Hind: Moulai Jalal Shamshuddin bin Hasan

25. Syedna Jalal Shamshuddin bin Hasan  جلال شمش الدين بن حسن 
 Tomb: Ahmedabad, India
 Dai period: 974–975 AH/ 1567–1568 AD
 Place of dai office; Ahmedabad, India
 Death: 16 Rabi-ul-akhir 975 AH
 Mazoon:  Dawood bin Ajabshah
After Dai Yusuf, the central headquarter of the Tayyibi dawa transferred from Yemen to India by his successor  Jalal Shamsuddin.

26. Syedna Dawood Bin Ajabshah Burhanuddin 
 Tomb: Ahmedabad, India
 Dai period: 975-999 AH/ 1568-1591 AD (23 Years)
 Place of dai office: Ahmedabad, India
 Death: 27 Rabi ul Aakhir 999 AH/1591 AD
 Mazoon: Syedna Dawood Bin Qutubshah
 Separation of Sulaymani Bohras, who followed Sulayman bin Hassan as the successor and not Syedna Dawood bin Qutubshah.

27. Syedna Dawood Bin Qutubshah Burhanuddin داود بن قطب شاه 
 Tomb: Ahmedabad, India
 Dai period: 999–1021 AH/ 1591–1612 AD
 Place of dai office: Ahmedabad, India
 Death: 15 Jumadil akhir 1021
 Mawazeen: Syedi Qazi Aminshah, Syedi Aminji bin Jalal,  Sheikh Adam Safiyuddin
 Mukasir: Al Maula Ali Mohammad bin Firoz

28. Syedna Sheikh Adam Safiuddin
 Tomb: Ahmedabad, India
 Dai period: 1021–1030 AH/ 1612–1622 AD
 Place of dai office: Ahmedabad, India
 Death: 7 Rajab 1030 AH
 Mazoon:  Abdut-tayyeb Zakiuddin
 Mukasir: Syedi Alimohammad bin Firoz
 Separation of Alavi Bohras, who followed Ali bin Ibrahim, grandson of Syedna Sheikh Adam Safiuddin as the successor and not Syedna Abduttayyeb Zakiuddin.

29. Syedna Abduttayyeb Zakiuddin I
 Tomb: Ahmedabad, India
 Dai period: 1030–1041 AH/ 1622–1633 AD
 Place of dai office: Ahmedabad, India
 Death: 2 Rabi-ul-avval 1041 AH
 Mazoon:  Ali Shamsuddin
 Mukasir:  Kassimkhan Zainuddin

30. Syedna Ali Shams al-Din IV bin Moulai Hasan
 Tomb: Hisne Afidah, Yemen
 Dai period: 1041–1042 AH/ 1633–1634 AD
 Place of dai office: Hisne Afidah, Yemen
 Death: 25 Rabi-ul-akhir 1042 AH
 Mazoon:  Kasimkhan Zainuddin

31. Syedna Qasim Khan Zainuddin bin Feerkhan
Tomb: Ahmedabad
 Dai period: 1042–1054 AH/ 1634–1646 AD
 Place of dai office: Ahmedabad, India
 Death: 9 Shawwal 1054
 Mazoon:  Qutubkhan Qutbuddin

32. Syedna Qutub Khan Qutbuddin Shaheed

Tomb: Ahmedabad
 Dai period: 1054–1056 AH/ 1646–1648 AD
 Place of dai office: Ahmedabad, India
 Death: 27 Jumadil akhir 1056
 Mazoon:  Feerkhan Shujauddin

33. Syedna Feer Khan Shujauddin bin Syedi Ahmedji
 Tomb: Ahmedabad, India
 Dai period: 1056–1065 AH/ 1648–1657 AD
 Place of dai office: Ahmedabad, India
 Death: 9 Zilkad 1065
 Mazoon:  Ismail Badruddin

34. Syedna Ismail Badruddin I bin Syedi Moulai Raj Saheb

 Tomb: Jamnagar, India
 Dai period: 1065–1085 AH/ 1657–1676 AD
 Place of dai office: Jamnagar, India
 Death: 23 Jumadil akhir 1085
 Mawazeen: Syedi Najamkhan,  Abdultaiyyeb Zakiyuddin
 Mukaserin: Al Maula Abdul Waheed, Al Maula Shams Khan

35. Syedna Abduttayyeb Zakiuddin II bin Syedna Ismail Badruddin I
 Dai period: 1085–1110 AH/ 1676–1692 AD
 Place of dai office: Jamnagar, India
 Death:12 Zilkad 1110
 Mazoon:  Musa Kalimuddin
 Mukasir: Al Maula Sheikh Adam Safiyuddin

36. Syedna Musa Kalimuddin bin Syedna Abduttayyeb Zakiuddin II
 Dai period: 1110–1122 AH/ 1692–1711 AD
 Place of dai office: Jam Nagar, India
 Death: 22 rabi ul akhir 1122
 Mawazeen: Syedi Sheikh Adam Safiyuddin, Syedna Noor Mohammad Nooruddin
 Mukasir: Syedi Khanji Pheer

37. Syedna Noor Mohammad Nooruddin bin Syedna Musa Kalimuddin

 Tomb: Mandvi, India
 Dai period: 1122–1130 AH/ 1711–1719 AD
 Place of dai office: Jamnagar, India
 Death: 4 Rajab 1130
 Mawazeen: Syedi Qasimkhan bin Syedi Hamzabhai, Syedna Ismail Badruddin bin Sheikh Adam
 Mukaserin: Syedi Hakimuddin bin Bawa Mulla Khan, Syedi Esamkhan, Sheikh Dawoodbhai

38. Syedna Ismail Badruddin II bin Syedi Sheikh Aadam
 Dai period: 1130–1150 AH/ 1719–1738 AD
 Place of dai office: Jam Nagar, India
 Death:7 Moharram 1150
 Mawazeen: Syedi Kassim Khan bin Syedi Hamzabhai, Syedi Abdul Qadir Hakimuddin bin Bawa Mulla Khan
 Mukasir: Syedi Shams bin Sheikh Hasan Khan

39. Syedna Ibrahim Wajiuddin bin Syedi Abdul Qadir
 Dai period: 1150–1168 AH/ 1738–1756 AD
 Place of dai office: Ujjain, India
 Death: 17 Moharram 1168
 Mawazeen: Syedi Sheikh Adam bin  Nooruddin,  Syedna Hebatullah al-Moayyed fid-Deen
 Mukasir: Syedi Ali bin Phirji

40. Syedna Hebatullah-il-Moayed Fiddeen bin Syedna Ibrahim Wajiuddin

 Dai period: 1168–1193 AH/ 1756–1780 AD
 Place of dai office: Ujjain, India
 Death: 1 Shaban 1193
 Mawazeen: Syedi Lukman ji bin Sheikh Dawood, Syedi Khan Bahadur, Sheikh Fazal Abdultaiyyeb, Syedi Hamza
 Mukasir: Syedi Abde Musa Kalimuddin

41. Syedna Abduttayyeb Zakiuddin III bin Badruddin

 Dai period: 1193–1200 AH/ 1780–1787 AD
 Tomb of Dai: Burhanpur,MP,India
 Death: 4 Safar 1200
 Mawazeen: Syedi Sheikh Adam Safiyuddin, Syedna Yusuf Najmuddin
 Mukasir: Syedna Abdeali Saifuddin

42. Syedna Yusuf Najmuddin bin Syedna Abduttayyeb Zakiuddin III
 Dai period: 1200–1213 AH/ 1787–1799 AD
 Tomb of Dai: Surat,Guj,India
 Death: 18 Jumadil Akhir 1213
 Mawazeen: Syedi Sheikh Adam Safiyuddin, Syedna Abdeali Saifuddin
 Mukaserin: Syedi Qamruddin, Sheikh Adam

43. Syedna Abde Ali Saifuddin bin Syedna Abduttayyeb Zakiuddin III

 Dai period: 1213–1232 AH/ 1799–1817 AD
 Place of Dai office & Tomb: Surat, India
 Death: 12 Zilkad 1232
 Mawazeen: Syedi Sheikh Adam Safiyuddin,  Syedna Mohammad Ezzuddin
 Mukaserin: Syedi Qamruddin, Syedi Sheikh Adam

44. Syedna Mohammed Ezzuddin bin Syedi Jivanjee
 Dai period: 1232–1236 AH/ 1817–1821 AD
 Place of Dai office & Tomb: Surat, India
 Death:19 Ramjan 1236
 Mazoon: Syedi Sheikh Adam Safiyuddin
 Mukasir:  Syedna Taiyyeb Zainuddin

45. Syedna Tayyeb Zainuddin bin Syedi Jivanjee
 Dai period: 1236–1252 AH/ 1821–1836 AD
 Place of Dai office & Tomb: Surat, India
 Death: 15 Zilkad 1252
 Mawazeen: Syedi Sheikh Adam Safiyuddin, Syedi Hebatullah Jamaluddin
 Mukasir: Syedna Mohammed Badruddin

46. Syedna Mohammed Badruddin bin Syedna Abde Ali Saifuddin 
 Dai period: 1252–1256 AH/ 1836–1840 AD
 Place of Dai office & Tomb: Surat, India
 Death: 29 Jumadil Akhir 1256
 Mazoon: Syedi Hebtullah Jamaluddin
 Mukasir: Syedna Abdulqadir Najmuddin

47. Syedna Abdul Qadir Najmuddin bin Syedna Tayyeb Zainuddin 
 Tomb : Ujjain, India
 Dai period: 1256–1302 AH/ 1840–1885 AD
 Place of dai office & Tomb: Ujjain, India
 Death: 26 Rajab 1302
 Mawazeen: Syedi Hebtullah Jamaluddin, Syedna Abdulhusain Husamuddin
 Mukaserin: Syedi Abdeali Imaduddin, Syedi Ismail Badruddin

48. Syedna Abdul Husain Husamuddin bin Syedna Tayyeb Zainuddin 

Tomb: Ahmedabad
 Dai period: 1302–1308 AH/ 1885–1891 AD
 Place of dai office & Tomb: Ahmedabad, India
 Death: 27 Zilhaj 1308
 Mazoon: Syedi Ismail Badruddin
 Mukasir: Syedna Mohammad Burhanuddin

49. Syedna Mohammed Burhanuddin I bin Syedna Abdul Qadir Najmuddin 
 Dai period: 1308–1323 AH/ 1891–1906 AD
 Place of dai office & Tomb: Surat, India
 Death: 27 Zilhaj 1323
 Mazoon: Syedi Ismail Badruddin
 Mukasir: Syedi Hasan Zakiuddin, Syedi Husain bs Ezzuddin

50. Syedna Abdullah Badruddin bin Syedna Abdul Husain Husamuddin 
 Dai period: 1323–1333 AH/ 1906–1915 AD
 Place of dai office & Tomb: Surat, India
 Death: 10 Rajab 1333 AH
 Mawazeen: Syedi Ismail Badruddin, Syedi Dawood Shehabuddin
 Mukaserin: Syedi Ibrahim Vajihuddin, Syedi Taiyyeb Zainuddin

51. Syedna Taher Saifuddin bin Syedna Mohammed Burhanuddin I 

 Dai period: 1333–1385 AH/ 1915–1965 AD 
 Place of dai office & Tomb: Mumbai, India
 Death: 19 Rajab, 1385 AH
 Mawazeen: Syedi Dawood Shahabuddin, Syedi Fazal Qutbuddin, Syedna Mohammed Burhanuddin
 Mukaserin: Syedi Ishaq Jamaluddin, Syedi Saleh Safiyuddin

52. Syedna Mohammed Burhanuddin II bin Syedna Taher Saifuddin 

 Dai period: 1385 AH - 1435 AH /1965 AD -2014 AD 
 Vafaat (Death) Date: 16 Rabil Awwal 1435. 17th January 2014

 Mazoon and Mansoos: Syedi Khuzaima Bhaisaheb Qutbuddin RA
 Mukasir: Syedi Saleh bhaisaab Safiyuddin & Syedi Husain bhaisaab Husamuddin

53.Syedna Khuzaima Qutbuddin bin Syedna Taher Saifuddin  

 Dai period: 16 Rabiul Awwal 1435 AH/ January 17 2014 AD - 23 Jumadil Ukhra 1437 AH / March 30, 2016 AD
 Place of Dai office: Mumbai, India
 Death: 23 Jumadil Ukhra, 1437 AH, March 30, 2016
Mansoos: Syedna Taher Fakhruddin TUS

54.Syedna Taher Fakhruddin Bin Syedna Khuzaima Qutbuddin 

 Dai period: 1437 AH
 Place of Dai office: Mumbai, India
 Mazoon: Syedi Abdeali Bhaisaheb Saifuddin AAB
 Mukasir: Syedi Husain Bhaisaheb Burhanuddin AAB

References

Further reading
Lathan, Young, Religion, Learning and Science
Bacharach, Joseph W. Meri, Medieval Islamic Civilisation
Bin Hasan, Idris, Uyun al-akhbar (Bin Hasan was the 19th Da'i of the Dawoodi Bohra.  This volume is a history of the Ismaili community from its origins up to the 12th century CE, the period of the Fatimid caliphs al-Mustansir (d. 487/1094), the time of Musta‘lian rulers including al-Musta‘li (d. 495/1101) and al-Amir (d. 524/1130), and then the Tayyibi Ismaili community in Yemen.)

 
Isma'ilism-related lists